This is a list of nominated candidates for the Strength in Democracy party in the 2015 Canadian federal election.

Candidate statistics

Newfoundland and Labrador - 1 seat

Ontario - 1 seat

Quebec - 14 seats

See also
Results of the Canadian federal election, 2015
Results by riding for the Canadian federal election, 2015

References

External links
 Elections Canada – List of Confirmed Candidates for the 41st General Election

Candidates in the 2015 Canadian federal election